Katrin Siska (born December 10, 1983) is an Estonian celebrity, vlogger, and musician, where she is a former member of the Estonian girl group, Vanilla Ninja.

Siska was born in Tallinn, Estonia. Alongside her musical commitments, she has also been studying finance and accounting at a vocational school and international relations and diplomacy in Tallinn. After moving back to Estonia with Vanilla Ninja from Germany in 2006, she returned to university to study law at Tallinn University of Technology.

She is fluent in Estonian, Russian, English, German and Finnish. At the university she has been studying also French.

Siska was a member of a choir during her schooltime and started playing the piano when she was 7 years old. She has a younger sister.

In August 2009, Siska joined the Estonian Centre Party.

In 2022, an announcement was made by Vanilla Ninja, that Siska had left the group.

References 

Katrin Siska graduated TTÜ University in 2012 (law).

External links 

  (English, Estonian)

1983 births
Living people
21st-century Estonian women singers
Estonian pop singers
Estonian people of Russian descent
Musicians from Tallinn
Eurovision Song Contest entrants for Switzerland
Vanilla Ninja members
Estonian Centre Party politicians
Tallinn University of Technology alumni